St. Patrick Regional Secondary School (St. Pat's) is an independent Catholic school in  Vancouver, under the administration of the CISVA (Catholic Independent Schools of the Vancouver Archdiocese) school board.

The school is co-educational which offers academic, fine arts, and business programs, as well as athletic, performing arts, and other extracurricular programs, for students from grades 8 to 12.

The school participates in sporting events under the name of the "Celtics", with the team colours of Green and White.

History 
Monsignor Forget is the founder of St. Patrick Regional Secondary School, in 1923, in Vancouver, British Columbia, Canada.  It was established by the Catholic Independent School Society of Vancouver Archdiocese to serve the educational needs of its twenty-three designated parishes.

Independent school status 
St. Patrick Regional Secondary School is classified as a Group 1 school under British Columbia's Independent School Act. It receives 50% funding from the Ministry of Education. The school receives no funding for capital costs. It is under charge of the Roman Catholic Archdiocese of Vancouver.

Feeder Parishes

 St. Andrews
 St. Joseph's (Vancouver)
 St. Patrick's
 St. Francis Xavier
 St. Paul's (Richmond)
 St. Casimir's
 Sacred Heart
 St. Augustine's
 St. Joseph the Worker
 Immaculate Conception
 Blessed Sacrament
 Holy Family
 Holy Name
 Our Lady of Perpetual Help
 Our Lady of Fatima
 St. Anthony of Padua
 Guardian Angels

Academic performance 

St. Pat's is ranked by the Fraser Institute. In 2008, it was ranked 74th out of 316 Vancouver, lower mainland schools.

Academic Departments

 Business
 Mathematics
 Performing Arts
 Social Studies
 Catholic theology
 English
 Humanities
 Information Technology
 Languages
 Science
 Physical Education
 Visual Arts

Athletic performance 

Both the Varsity Boys & Girls basketball teams participate in the BC Catholic Basketball Championship, the largest tournament in the province of BC.

The Senior Girls Volleyball of 2001–2002, 2002–2003, and 2008–2009 teams won first place at the Provincial Championships.

In 2010, the Senior Boys Basketball team won 'A' Provincial Championships. In 2020, the Junior Boys Basketball team won the Provincial Championships.

In 2020, the Junior Boys Basketball team won the Provincial Championships after defeating Sir Winston Churchill Secondary School (Vancouver), following a game-winning three-pointer by Irish Coquia. In 2022, the Junior Boys again made the tournament's final four, ultimately placing 3rd after entering the tournament as the 23rd seed.

Artistic performance 

St. Patrick Regional Secondary provides students with a variety of performing & non-performing arts.

A majority of the school's student body are involved with the school's choral performance program. With nearly 50% of the school population participating in choir each year, the choral program has grown to eight different ensembles, led by conductor Tony Araujo and artist in residence Gerda Blok-Wilson. The hard work of the students involved in the school's Concert choir and Chamber choir, consisting of students in Grade 10 to 12, is recognized and celebrated at the school's Spirit Alive Gala Choir Concert, held annually at the Chan Centre for the Performing Arts.

Students in the Chamber choir, the school's audition-based choral ensemble have travelled to Chicago and Los Angeles to compete in the "Festival of Gold" US National Choral Invitational. In addition to travelling to the United States of America, the Chamber choir has travelled to Portugal to host and perform at concerts. In addition, the Choirs have been invited to perform at international conferences and festivals throughout North America, Europe and Asia, including concerts at the Kennedy Center for the Performing Arts in Washington, DC, Canterbury Cathedral, Carnegie Hall in New York City and the United Nations. Songs sung cover a wide range of genres, from traditional religious choral music to folk, pop, classical and more, including a rendition of Northwest Passage written by Stan Rogers.

Notable alumni 
• Finn Wolfhard, Actor

• Ethan Ogrodniczuk, Cyclist

• Madeleine Thien, Author

• Yonah Martin, Canadian Senator

References

External links 
St. Pat's Website
Roman Catholic Archdiocese of Vancouver listing for St. Pat's
 The Fraser Institute School Performance Report Cards

High schools in Vancouver
Private schools in British Columbia
Catholic secondary schools in British Columbia
Educational institutions established in 1923
1923 establishments in British Columbia